The AMD Patriot is a light sport aircraft produced by Aircraft Manufacturing and Design Co. In 2007 AMD announced that they intended to produce a high-wing, all metal, tricycle gear aircraft with a Continental O-200 engine to compete with the Cessna Skycatcher.

Specifications

See also
AMD Alarus

References

External links
 https://web.archive.org/web/20081004132042/http://www.silverskyaviation.com/pages/patriot150.html

2000s United States civil utility aircraft
Light-sport aircraft
Patriot
Single-engined tractor aircraft
High-wing aircraft